Bruno Sacco (born 12 November 1933) is an Italian automobile designer who served as the head of styling at German car giant Daimler-Benz between 1975 and 1999.

Biography

According to Sacco himself, he was first inspired towards car design as an eighteen-year-old, after seeing a Raymond Loewy-styled 1950 Studebaker Commander Regal as he cycled through the streets of Tarvisio in 1951. Afterwards he could not get the car out of his head, and "knew [his] life had been decided."

After studying mechanical engineering at the Polytechnic University of Turin he attempted to seek work at the renowned Ghia and Pininfarina carrozzerie, before moving to Germany when his efforts proved unsuccessful. Daimler-Benz hired him as a stylist in 1958, and although he intended to stay only briefly, his marriage to Berliner Annemarie Ibe in 1959 and the birth of their daughter Marina the following year made him reassess his plans.

Sacco rose through the corporate ranks at Daimler-Benz over the next fifteen years, becoming chief engineer in 1974, before taking over from Friedrich Geiger as head of the Daimler-Benz styling center at Sindelfingen in 1975. For the next quarter century until he retired in 1999 he was responsible for the design of every Mercedes road car, bus, and truck. Among his numerous works are the C111 concept car, three successive iterations of the S-Class luxury car (the W126, W140, and W220), the R129 SL convertible, the C-Class W202 compact executive car, the W124 and W210 versions of the E-Class sedan, the CLK and SLK sports cars, the M-Class luxury sport utility vehicle, and second generation C-Class W203. Sacco made significant contribution to the design the W123, the best ever selling Mercedes, as well as his very last design R230 SL convertible (in 1997). His favourite design, because of its significance to the company, is the Mercedes-Benz 190 introduced in 1982, while he confesses dissatisfaction with the 1991 S-Class, which he considers to be "four inches too tall". In his retirement he has given up his old red SLK convertible in favour of a dark blue Mercedes-Benz 560SEC coupé (C126).

As of 2020, Sacco lives in Sindelfingen, a suburb of Stuttgart, owning in addition to the 1989 C126 560SEC also a 2019 C238 E-Class Coupe, also in dark blue.

Design themes

It took several years for Sacco to fully understand the culture at Daimler-Benz, since by his own attestation there were no "written [styling or design] laws". After following the philosophy of company co-founder Gottlieb Daimler, 'Nothing but the best', he began to better appreciate the direction he should follow.

He has long advocated "horizontal homogeneity" and "vertical affinity", terms he uses to describe the continuity and homogeneity of Mercedes designs. Horizontal homogeneity is the common styling cues between different models in the manufacturer's range; there should be a strong visual relationship between the smallest and largest cars. Vertical affinity is the requirement for cars not to be rendered stylistically obsolete by their successors, ensuring greater timelessness of design. Sacco felt this was of special importance to Mercedes, whose cars' reputation for longevity meant that their typical life cycle was 20 to 30 years.

Awards
Sacco accumulated numerous awards and honours during his career; his overall body of work has been acknowledged by Car Magazine's "Designer's Designer" (1996) as chosen by forty of his peers, the EyesOn Design Lifetime Achievement Award (1997), and the Raymond Loewy Foundation's Lucky Strike Designer Award (1997). He was shortlisted as one of the 25 Car Designers of the Century in 1999, and was inducted into the Automotive Hall of Fame in 2006 and the European Automotive Hall of Fame in 2007.

In his homeland, he was awarded the Grand Official Order of Merit of the Republic in 1991, and received an honorary doctorate from the University of Udine in 2002.

Books

References

Further reading

 
 

1933 births
Living people
People from Udine
Italian automobile designers
Mercedes-Benz designers